The Suchiate River is a river that marks the southwesternmost part of the border between Mexico (state of Chiapas) and Guatemala (department of San Marcos). From its sources on the southern slopes of the Tacaná volcano in the Sierra Madre range of Guatemala, the river flows in a south-southwesterly direction to the border with Mexico at Unión Juárez, past the border towns Talismán and El Carmen, and then Ciudad Tecún Umán and Ciudad Hidalgo (Chiapas) further downstream, where the Puente Rodolfo Robles and a railway bridge cross the river, and on to the Pacific Ocean. Its name comes from the Nahuatl name Xochiatl meaning "flower-water".

The pre-Columbian archaeological site of Izapa lies along the river.

References

The Prentice Hall American World Atlas, 1984.
Rand McNally, The New International Atlas, 1993.

See also 
 Rail transport in Guatemala
 Rail transport in Mexico

Rivers of Guatemala
Rivers of Mexico
Guatemala–Mexico border
International rivers of North America
Rivers of Chiapas